Monika Zofia Pyrek-Rokita (born 11 August 1980) is a retired Polish pole vaulter.

Born in Gdynia, competing at the 2004 Olympics, she placed fourth with 4.55 metres, just behind another Polish pole vaulter born in Gdynia, Anna Rogowska. Monika Pyrek won a silver medal in the 2005 World Championships in Athletics with the result 4.60 m. She also won the silver medal at the 2006 European Athletics Championships.

Monika Pyrek's personal best is 4.82 metres.
She has won the Polish Championship several times, most recently at the 2007 Polish Athletics Championships in Poznań.

Medical Condition

In the interview with Sportowe Fakty, Pyrek revealed that in 2003, she was diagnosed with Hashimoto's thyroiditis. She wondered if she was diagnosed sooner, she might have won more medals.

For her sport achievements, she received:
 Knight's Cross of the Order of Polonia Restituta (5th Class) in 2009.

She officially retired on 11 January 2013. A day later she married Norbert Rokita, her longtime agent and life partner.

Major competitions record

Taniec z Gwiazdami
Monika Pyrek won the 12th season of Polish Dancing with the Stars - Taniec z Gwiazdami.

References

External links

 Official web site of Monika Pyrek  (requires Adobe Flash for navigation)

1980 births
Living people
Sportspeople from Gdynia
Polish female pole vaulters
Athletes (track and field) at the 2000 Summer Olympics
Athletes (track and field) at the 2004 Summer Olympics
Athletes (track and field) at the 2008 Summer Olympics
Athletes (track and field) at the 2012 Summer Olympics
Olympic athletes of Poland
Knights of the Order of Polonia Restituta
Dancing with the Stars winners
World Athletics Championships medalists
European Athletics Championships medalists
Lechia Gdańsk athletes
Competitors at the 2001 Goodwill Games